The term "put to sleep" may refer to:

anesthesia
animal euthanasia
Actually helping something go to sleep